Colonies in antiquity were post-Iron Age city-states founded from a mother-city (its "metropolis"), not from a territory-at-large. Bonds between a colony and its metropolis remained often close, and took specific forms during the period of classical antiquity.  Generally, colonies founded by the ancient Phoenicians, Carthage, Rome, Alexander the Great and his successors remained tied to their metropolis, but Greek colonies of the Archaic and Classical eras were sovereign and self-governing from their inception. While Greek colonies were often founded to solve social unrest in the mother-city, by expelling a part of the population, Hellenistic, Roman, Carthaginian, and Han Chinese colonies were used for trade, expansion and empire-building.

Egyptian colony
Egyptian settlement and colonisation is attested from about 3200 BC onward all over the area of southern Canaan with almost every type of artifact: architecture (fortifications, embankments and buildings), pottery, vessels, tools, weapons, seals, etc. Narmer had Egyptian pottery produced in Canaan and exported back to Egypt, from regions such as Arad, En Besor, Rafiah, and Tel ʿErani. Recently, a contemporary brewery belonging to a Bronze Age Egyptian settlement has been found in Tel Aviv. Shipbuilding was known to the ancient Egyptians as early as 3000 BC, and perhaps earlier. The Archaeological Institute of America reports that the earliest dated ship — dating to 3000 BC – may have possibly belonged to Pharaoh Aha.

Phoenician colonies

The Phoenicians were the major trading power in the Mediterranean in the early part of the first millennium BC. They had trading contacts in Egypt and Greece, and established colonies as far west as modern Spain, at Gadir (modern Cádiz), and modern Morocco, at Tingis and Mogador. From Spain and Morocco the Phoenicians controlled access to the Atlantic Ocean and the trade routes to Britain and Senegal. 

The most famous and successful of Phoenician colonies was founded by settlers from Tyre in 814–813 BC and called Kart-Hadasht (Qart-ḥadašt, literally "New Town"), known to history as Carthage. The Carthaginians later founded  their own colonies in the western Mediterranean area, notable a colony in the southeast of Spain, Carthago Nova, which was eventually  conquered by their enemy, Rome.

According to María Eugenia Aubet, Professor of Archaeology at the Pompeu Fabra University, Barcelona: 
The earliest presence of Phoenician material in the West is documented within the precinct of the ancient city of Huelva, Spain... The high proportion of Phoenician pottery among the new material found in 1997 in the Plaza de las Monjas in Huelva argues in favour, not of a few first sporadic contacts in the zone, but of a regular presence of Phoenician people from the start of the ninth century BC. The recent radiocarbon dates from the earliest levels in Carthage situate the founding of this Tyrian colony in the years 835–800 cal BC, which coincides with the dates handed down by Flavius Josephus and Timeus for the founding of the city.

Ancient Greek colonies

In Ancient Greece, a vanquished people would sometimes found a colony, leaving their homes to escape subjection at the hand of a foreign enemy. Sometimes colonies formed as a sequel to civil disorders, where the losers in internecine battles left to form a new city elsewhere; sometimes they would form to get rid of surplus population and thereby to avoid internal convulsions; and also, as a result of ostracism. But in most cases, colony-founders aimed to establish and facilitate relations of trade with foreign countries and to further the wealth of the mother-city (in  mētropolis). Colonies were established in Ionia and Thrace as early as the 8th century BC.

More than thirty Greek city-states had multiple colonies. They became dotted across the Mediterranean world, with the most active colony-founding city, Miletus, of the Ionian League, spawning ninety colonies stretching throughout the Mediterranean Sea, from the shores of the Black Sea and Anatolia (modern Turkey) in the east, to the southern coast of the Iberian Peninsula in the west, as well as Magna Graecia (southern Italy) and several colonies on the Libyan coast of northern Africa, from the late 9th to the 5th centuries BC.

Greeks founded two similar types of colony, the apoikía (ἀποικία from ἀπό apó “away from” + οἶκος oîkos “home”, pl. ἀποικίαι apoikiai), an independent city-state, and the emporion (ἐμπόριov, pl. ἐμπόρια emporia), a trading-colony.

The Greek city-states began establishing colonies between 900 – 800 BC, at first at Al Mina on the coast of Syria and the Greek emporium Pithekoussai at Ischia in the Bay of Naples in Magna Graecia, both established about 800 BC by Euboeans.

Two waves of new colonists set out from Greece at the transition between the Dark Ages and the start of the Archaic Period – the first in the early 8th century BC and a second burst of the colonizing spirit in the 6th century. Population growth and cramped spaces at home seem an insufficient explanation, while the economic and political dynamics produced by the competition among the frequently kingless Greek city-states – newly introduced as a concept and striving to expand their spheres of economic influence – better fits as their true incentive. Through this Greek expansion the use of coins flourished throughout the Mediterranean Basin.

Influential Greek colonies in the western Mediterranean – many in present-day Southern Italy — included Cyme, Rhegium (Rhegion) by Chalcis and Zankle (c. 8th century), Syracuse by Corinth/Tenea (c. 734 BC), Naxos by Chalcis (c. 734 BC), Massalia (Marseille, France, c. 598 BC) and Agathe (shortly after Massalia) by Phokaia, Elea in Italy and Emporion in Spain by Phokaia/Massalia (c. 540 BC and early 6th century), Antipolis in France by Achaea, Alalia in Corsica by Phokaia/Massalia (c. 545 BC), and Cyrene (Cyrenaica, Libya) by Thera (762/61 and 632/31 BC).

The Greeks also colonised Crimea in the Black Sea. The settlements they established there included the city of Chersonesos (modern Sevastopol). Another area with significant Greek colonies was the coast of ancient Illyria on the Adriatic Sea (e.g. Aspalathos, modern Split, Croatia).

Cicero remarks on the extensive Greek colonization, noting that "It were as though a Greek fringe has been woven about the shores of the barbarians." Several formulae generally shaped the solemn and sacred occasions when a new colony set forth. If a Greek city decided to send out a colony, the citizenry almost invariably consulted an oracle, such as the Oracle of Delphi, beforehand. Sometimes certain classes of citizens were called upon to take part in the enterprises; sometimes one son was chosen by lot from every house where there were several sons; and strangers expressing a desire to join were admitted. A person of distinction was selected to guide the emigrants and to make the necessary arrangements. It was usual to honor these founders as heroes after their death. Some of the sacred fire was taken from the public hearth in the Prytaneum, from which the fire on the public hearth of the new city was kindled. Just as each individual had his private shrines, so the new community maintained the worship of its chief domestic deities, the colony sending embassies and votive gifts to the mother-city's principal festivals for centuries afterwards.

After the conquests of the Macedonian Kingdom and Alexander the Great, a further number of Hellenistic colonies were founded also in Asia (as far away as India), Europe and Africa.

Greek colonies in Anatolia
The Mycenaeans Greeks by the 15th century BC had reached Rhodes, Crete, Cyprus, where Teucer is said to have founded the first colony, and the shores of Asia Minor. Moreover, Greeks were settled in Ionia and Pontus. Miletus in Ionia was an ancient Greek city on the western coast of Anatolia, near the mouth of the Maeander River. In the Late Bronze Age (13th century BC), Milesia saw the arrival of  the Carians, Luwian language speakers from south central Anatolia. Later in that century, other Greeks arrived. The city at that time rebelled against the Hittite Empire. After the fall of that empire, the city was destroyed in the 12th century BC and starting about 1000 BC was resettled extensively by the Ionian Greeks. 

Before the invasion from Persia in the middle of the 6th century BC, Miletus was considered the greatest and wealthiest Greek Polis. Over several centuries, numerous Ancient Greek city-states were established on the coasts of Anatolia. Greeks started Western philosophy on the western coast of Anatolia (Pre-Socratic philosophy). Thales, Anaximander, Anaximenes, Diogenes of Apollonia were among of the renowned Milesian school philosophers. Heraclitus lived in Ephesus (/ˈɛfəsəs/;[1] Greek: Ἔφεσος Ephesos; Turkish: Efes) another ancient Greek city and Anaxagoras was from Clazomenae, a city on the coast of Ionia and a member of the Ionian League. All Ancient Greek dialects were spoken in Anatolia depending on the origin of each City state and the list of ancient Greek theatres in Anatolia is one of the longest among all places Greeks had settled. 

Greeks traditionally lived in the region of Pontus, on the south shores of the Black Sea and in the Pontic Alps in northeastern Anatolia, the province of Kars in Caucasus, and also in Georgia. Those from southern Russia, Ukraine, and Crimea are often referred to as 'Northern Pontic Greeks', in contrast to those from 'South Pontus', which strictly speaking is Pontus proper. Those from Georgia, northeastern Anatolia, and the ones who lived in present-day Armenia are often referred to as 'Eastern Pontic Greeks' or Caucasus Greeks. Many Greek-founded colonies are well known cities to this day. Sinope (Greek: Σινώπη, Sinōpē) and Trabzon (Greek: Τραπεζοῦς Trapezous), were founded by Milesian traders (756 BC) as well as Samsun, Rize and Amasra. Greek was the lingua franca of Anatolia from the conquests of Alexander the Great up to the invasion of the Seljuk Turks in the eleventh century AD.

Relations of colony and metropolis

The relation between colony and mother-city (metropolis) was viewed as one of mutual affection. Differences were resolved peacefully whenever possible, war being deemed excusable only in cases of extreme necessity. (Note though that the Peloponnesian War of 431–404 BC broke out in part as a result of a dispute between Corinth and her colony of Corcyra.) 

The charter of foundation contained general provisions for the arrangement of the affairs of the colony, and also some special enactments. A colony would usually adopt the constitution of the mother-city, but the new city remained politically independent. The "holy fire" of the metropolis was preserved in a special place to remind people of the common ties. If the colony sent out a fresh colony on its own account, the mother-city was generally consulted, or was at least requested to furnish a leader. Frequently the colonies, declaring their commitment to the various metropolitic alliances formed in the Greek mainland and for religious reasons, would pay tribute in religious centres such as Delphi, Olympia, or Delos.

The cleruchs (κληροῦχοι, klêrouchoi) formed a special class of Greek colonists, each being assigned an individual plot of land (κλῆρος, klêros). The trade factories set up in foreign countries, such as Naucratis in Egypt, were somewhat different from ordinary colonies, with the members retaining the right of domicile in their own homeland and confining themselves to their own quarter in the foreign city.

Roman colonies

It was an old custom in ancient Italy to send out colonies for the purpose of securing new conquests. The Romans, having no standing army, used to plant bodies of their own citizens in conquered towns as a kind of garrison. These bodies would consist partly of Roman citizens, usually to the number of three hundred; partly of members of the Latin League, in larger numbers. One third of the conquered territory was taken for the settlers. The coloniae civium Romanorum (colonies of Roman citizens) were specially intended to secure the two coasts of Italy, and were hence called coloniae maritimae. The far more numerous coloniae Latinae served the same purpose for the mainland, but they were also inhabited by Latins and much more populated.

The duty of leading the colonists and founding the settlement was entrusted to a commission usually consisting of three members. These men continued to stand in the relation of patrons (patroni) to the colony after its foundation. The colonists entered the conquered city in military array, preceded by banners, and the foundation was celebrated with special solemnities. The coloniae were free from taxes, and had their own constitution, a copy of the Roman, electing from their own body their Senate and other officers of State. To this constitution the original inhabitants had to submit. The coloniae civium Romanorum retained Roman citizenship, and were free from military service, their position as outposts being regarded as an equivalent. The members of the coloniae Latinae served among the socii, the allies, and possessed the so-called ius Latinum or Latinitas. This secured to them the right of acquiring property, the concept of commercium, and the right of settlement in Rome, and under certain conditions the power of becoming Roman citizens; though in course of time these rights underwent many limitations.

From the time of the Gracchi the colonies lost their military character. Colonization came to be regarded as a means of providing for the poorest class of the Roman Plebs. After the time of Sulla it was adopted as a way of granting land to veteran soldiers. The right of founding colonies passed into the hands of the Roman emperors during the Principate, who used it mainly in the provinces for the exclusive purpose of establishing military settlements, partly with the old idea of securing conquered territory. It was only in exceptional cases that the provincial colonies enjoyed the immunity from taxation which was granted to those in Italy.

Chinese colonies

Imperial China during the Han dynasty (202 BC–220 AD) extended its rule over what is now much of China proper as well as Inner Mongolia, northern Vietnam, northern Korea, the Hexi Corridor of Gansu, and the Tarim Basin region of Xinjiang on the easternmost fringes of Central Asia. After the nomadic Mongolic Xiongnu ruler Hunye (渾邪) was defeated by Huo Qubing in 121 BC, settlers from various regions of China under the rule of Emperor Wu of Han colonized the Hexi Corridor and Ordos Plateau. Tuntian, self-sustaining agricultural military garrisons, were established in frontier outposts to secure the massive territorial gains and Silk Road trade routes leading into Central Asia. Emperor Wu oversaw the Han conquest of Nanyue in 111 BC, bringing areas of Guangdong, Guangxi, Hainan Island, and northern Vietnam under Han rule, and by 108 BC completed the Han conquest of Gojoseon in what is now North Korea. Han Chinese colonists in the Xuantu and Lelang commanderies of northern Korea dealt with occasional raids by the Goguryeo and Buyeo kingdoms, but conducted largely peaceful trade relations with surrounding Korean peoples who in turn became heavily influenced by Chinese culture.

In 37 AD the Eastern Han general Ma Yuan sent Han Chinese to the northeastern frontier and settled defeated Qiang tribes within Han China's Tianshui Commandery and Longxi Commandery. Ma pursued a similar policy in the south when he defeated the Trưng Sisters of Jiaozhi, in what is now modern northern Vietnam, resettling hundreds of Vietnamese into China's Jing Province in 43 AD, seizing their sacred bronze drums as rival symbols of royal power, and reinstating Han authority and laws over Jiaozhi. Historian Rafe de Crespigny remarks that this was a "brief but effective campaign of colonisation and control", before the general returned north in 44 AD.

Cao Song, an Eastern Han administrator of Dunhuang, had military colonies established in what is now Yiwu County near Hami in 119 AD. However, Empress Deng Sui, regent for the young Emperor Shang of Han, pursued a slow, cautious policy of settlement on the advice of Ban Yong, son of Ban Chao, as the Eastern Han Empire came into conflict with the Jushi Kingdom, the Shanshan and their Xiongnu allies located around the Taklamakan Desert in the Western Regions. In 127 AD Ban Yong was able to defeat the Karasahr in battle and colonies were established all the way to Turfan, but by the 150s AD the Han presence in the Western Regions began to wane. Towards the end of the Han dynasty, chancellor Cao Cao established agricultural military colonies for settling wartime refugees. Cao Cao also established military colonies in Anhui province in 209 AD as a means to clearly demarcate a border between his realm and that of his political rival Sun Quan.

See also

 Classical demography
 List of cities founded by the Romans
 List of ancient cities in Thrace and Dacia
 List of settlements in Illyria
 Alexandria (disambiguation)
 Roman Empire

Notes

Further reading
Antonaccio, Carla M. 2001. "Ethnicity and colonization." In Ancient perceptions of Greek ethnicity. Edited by Irad Malkin, 113–57. Cambridge, MA: Harvard University Press.
————. 2003. "Hybridity and the cultures within Greek culture." In The cultures within ancient Greek culture: Contact, conflict, collaboration. Edited by Carol Dougherty and Leslie Kurke, 57–74. Cambridge, UK: Cambridge University Press.
Aubet, Maria Eugenia. 2001. The Phoenicians and the west: Politics, colonies and trade. 2nd ed. Translated by Mary Turton. New York: Cambridge University Press.
Boardman, John. 1999. The Greeks Overseas: Their Early Colonies and Trade. 4th ed. London: Thames and Hudson.
————. 2001. "Aspects of 'colonization.'" Bulletin of the American Schools of Oriental Research 322: 33–42.
Branigan, Keith. 1981. "Minoan colonialism." Annual of the British School at Athens 76: 23–33.
Broadhead, William. 2007. "Colonization, land distribution, and veteran settlement." In A companion to the Roman army. Edited by Paul Erdkamp, 148–63. Blackwell Companions to the Ancient World. Malden, MA: Blackwell.
Cornell, Timothy J. 1995. The beginnings of Rome: Italy and Rome from the Bronze Age to the Punic Wars (c. 1000–264 BC). Routledge History of the Ancient World. New York: Routledge.
Demetriou, Denise. 2012. Negotiating identity in the ancient Mediterranean. Cambridge, UK: Cambridge University Press.
Donnellan, Lieve, Valentino Nizzo, and Gert-Jan Burgers, eds. 2016. Conceptualizing early colonisation. Brussels: Belgisch Historisch Instituut te Rome.
Dunbabin T. J. 1948. The Western Greeks. Oxford: Thames & Hudson.
Forrest, W. G. 1957. "Colonisation and the rise of Delphi." Historia: Zeitschrift für Alte Geschichte 6 (2): 160–75.
Garland, Robert. 2014. Wandering Greeks: The ancient Greek diaspora from the age of Homer to the death of Alexander the Great. Princeton, NJ: Princeton University Press.
Graham, A. John. 1983. Colony and mother city in ancient Greece. 2nd ed. Chicago: Ares.
————. 2001. Collected Papers On Greek Colonization. Leiden: Brill.
Hägg, Robin, and Nanno Marinatos, eds. 1984. The Minoan Thalassocracy: Myth and reality; Proceedings of the third international symposium at the Swedish Institute in Athens, 31 May–5 June 1982. Stockholm: Swedish Institute at Athens.
Hodos, Tamar. 1999. "Intermarriage in the western Greek colonies." Oxford Journal of Archaeology 18: 61–78.
Horden, Peregrine, and Nicholas Purcell. 2000. The corrupting sea: A study of Mediterranean history. Oxford: Blackwell.
Keppie, Lawrence. 1984. "Colonisation and veteran settlement in Italy in the first century A.D." Papers of the British School at Rome 52: 77–114.
Knappett, Carl, and Irene Nikolakopoulou. 2008. "Colonialism without colonies? A Bronze Age case study from Akrotiri, Thera." Hesperia: The Journal of the American School of Classical Studies at Athens 77 (1): 1–42.
Malkin, Irad. 1987. Religion and Colonization In Ancient Greece. Leiden: Brill.
————. 2011. A Small Greek World: Networks In the Ancient Mediterranean. New York: Oxford University Press.
Mann, J. C. 1983. Legionary recruitment and veteran settlement during the Principate. Edited by Margaret M. Roxan. London: University of London.
Niemeyer, Hans-Georg. 1990. "The Phoenicians in the Mediterranean: A non-Greek model for expansion and settlement in antiquity." In Greek colonists and native populations: Proceedings of the First Australian Congress of Classical Archaeology, held in honour of emeritus professor A. D. Trendall. Edited by Jean-Paul Descœudres, 469–89. Oxford: Clarendon.
Salmon, Edward T. 1936. "Roman colonisation from the Second Punic War to the Gracchi." Journal of Roman Studies 26 (1): 47–67.
————. 1955. "Roman expansion and Roman colonization in Italy." Phoenix 9 (2): 63–75.
————. 1969. Roman colonization under the Republic. Aspects of Greek and Roman Life. London: Thames and Hudson.
Stek, Tesse D., and Jeremia Pelgrom, eds. 2014. "Roman Republican colonization: New perspectives from archaeology and ancient history." Papers of the Royal Netherlands Institute in Rome 2014 (62). Rome: Palombi Editori.
Sweetman, Rebecca J., ed. 2011. Roman colonies in the first century of their foundation. Oxford: Oxbow.
Ridgway, David. 1992. The first Western Greeks. Cambridge, UK: Cambridge University Press.
Tartaron, Thomas E. 2013. Maritime networks in the Mycenaean world. Cambridge, UK: Cambridge University Press.
Tsetskhladze, Gocha R., ed. 2006. Greek Colonisation: An Account of Greek Colonies and Other Settlements Overseas. Leiden: Brill.
van Dommelen, Peter. 1998. In colonial grounds: A comparative study of colonialism and rural settlement in first millennium BC west central Sardinia. Leiden, The Netherlands: University of Leiden.

External links
 Ancient History Encyclopedia Greek Colonization
 Map of Greek Colonies 9th-6th Centuries BC 
 The Roman Law Library by Professor Yves Lassard and Alexandr Koptev
 Donald Kagan, Introduction to Ancient Greek History. 6. The Greek "Renaissance" - Colonization and Tyranny (Open Yale Courses)
 A complete catalogue of ancient ports.
 Ancient Greek Colonization and Trade and their Influence on Greek Art-The Metropolitan Museum of Art

 
 
Antiquity
Roman law